Lukovica pri Brezovici is a settlement southwest of Ljubljana in the Municipality of Log-Dragomer in the Inner Carniola region of Slovenia.

Geography
Lukovica pri Brezovici is an elongated settlement on both sides of the old road from Ljubljana to Vrhnika. Fat Peak rises to the north, and the Ljubljana Marsh lies to the south; the village's territory encompasses a large area of the marsh known as Big Bog. Most of the fields belonging to the village lie to the south, where the soil is boggy, and in places loamy and damp. There are also some fields on the slope of Fat Peak above the village.

Name
Lukovica pri Brezovici was attested in written sources in 1431 as Lukowicz (and as Lukobicz in 1479). The name is probably derived from the common noun luk 'leek, onion, garlic', referring to the local vegetation. The name of the settlement was changed from Lukovica to Lukovica pri Brezovici in 1955. In the past the German name was Lukowitz.

References

External links
Lukovica pri Brezovici on Geopedia

Populated places in the Municipality of Log-Dragomer